John Coady (born 25 August 1960 in Dublin) is an Irish former footballer who played at both the left back position and in left midfield.

Early years
He attended Synge Street CBS, where he played on the school's first successful soccer team, winning the Leinster Junior School's Cup in 1977. He played club football at Leicester Celtic AFC He also played gaelic football both at school and for Synge Street PPGFC.

Professional career
John is a lifelong Shamrock Rovers supporter and so his dream came true when he made his League of Ireland debut on 31 October 1982 away to University College Dublin A.F.C. scoring twice in a 2-2 draw. After winning 3 Leagues and the FAI Cup twice he signed for Chelsea F.C. in London for £25,000 in December 1986.

He made his debut at the age of 26 on 18 April 1987 and scoring the only Chelsea goal in a 1-1 draw away to Queens Park Rangers. He made 9 league appearances (plus 7 more as a substitute) with Chelsea, scoring in two of them.

Coady transferred to Derry City F.C. in October 1988 for £15,000  where he won the domestic treble.

Following another stint at Shamrock Rovers in the 1992/93 season where he scored once in 23 total appearances he moved on to play for Monaghan United (two spells), Dundalk and Home Farm Everton before finishing his career at Drogheda United where he scored on his debut .

He played in the 1995-96 UEFA Cup for Dundalk.

He represented the League of Ireland XI twice and scored once in the European Cup in 7 European appearances for Rovers. He also won one cap for Ireland in the 1988 Summer Olympics qualifiers. Other honours included captaining the League of Ireland in victories over IFK Göteborg and the League of Wales.

But perhaps the pinnacle of his career was when in 1989, he was named on Frank Burke's Synge Street best all time X1. He stated after making the team that his goalscoring debut for Chelsea paled into insignificance in comparison to this accolade.

Honours
 League of Ireland: 6
 Shamrock Rovers 1983/84, 1984/85, 1985/86, 1986/87
 Derry City 1989/90
 Dundalk F.C. 1994/95
 FAI Cup: 3
 Shamrock Rovers 1985, 1986
 Derry City 1989
 League of Ireland Cup
 Derry City - 1989
LFA President's Cup: 
 Shamrock Rovers 1984/85

References

1960 births
Living people
Republic of Ireland association footballers
Association football defenders
Shamrock Rovers F.C. players
Derry City F.C. players
Dundalk F.C. players
Drogheda United F.C. players
League of Ireland players
Chelsea F.C. players
English Football League players
People educated at Synge Street CBS
League of Ireland XI players
Leicester Celtic A.F.C. players
Monaghan United F.C. players